There were six special elections to the United States House of Representatives in 2021 during the 117th United States Congress.

All of the elections were won by the party previously holding the seat. Therefore, there were no net changes in party.

Summary 
Elections are listed by date and district.

|-
! 
| 
| 
| 2014
| data-sort-value=03/20/2021  | Incumbent's term expired January 3, 2021. Representative-elect Luke Letlow died December 29, 2020, of COVID-19.New member elected March 20, 2021.Republican hold.
| nowrap | 

|-
! 
| 
| 
| 2010
| data-sort-value=04/24/2021  | Incumbent resigned January 15, 2021, to serve as the director of the Office of Public Liaison and as a Senior Advisor to Joe Biden.New member elected April 24, 2021, after no candidate received a majority vote in the March 20 jungle primary.Democratic hold.
| nowrap | 

|-
! 
| 
| 
| 2018
| data-sort-value=06/01/2021  | Incumbent resigned March 16, 2021, to become U.S. Secretary of the Interior.New member elected June 1, 2021.Democratic hold.
| nowrap | 

|-
! 
| 
| 
| 2018
| data-sort-value=07/27/2021  | Incumbent died February 7, 2021, of COVID-19.New member elected July 27, 2021, after no candidate received a majority vote in the May 1 jungle primary.Republican hold.
| nowrap | 

|-
! 
| 
| 
| 2008 
| data-sort-value=11/02/2021  | Incumbent resigned March 10, 2021, to become U.S. Secretary of Housing and Urban Development.New member elected November 2, 2021.Democratic hold.
| nowrap | 

|-
! 
| 
| 
| 2010
| data-sort-value=11/02/2021  | Incumbent resigned May 16, 2021, to become the president and CEO of the Ohio Chamber of Commerce.New member elected November 2, 2021.Republican hold.
| nowrap | 

|}

Louisiana's 5th congressional district 

Republican Representative-elect Luke Letlow died on December 29, 2020, before taking office. His seat was left vacant at the start of the next session of Congress. A special nonpartisan election was called by Governor John Bel Edwards for March 20, 2021. Despite a large field of Republican candidates, the election was won by Letlow's widow, Julia Letlow, who won a majority of the vote outright, eliminating the need for a runoff.

Louisiana's 2nd congressional district 

Incumbent Democrat Cedric Richmond resigned on January 15, 2021, to join the Biden administration, becoming the director of the White House Office of Public Liaison and a Senior Advisor to the President. A special nonpartisan election was called by Governor John Bel Edwards for March 20, with a runoff scheduled for April 24.

No candidate reached the 50% threshold needed to win the first round on March 20. Troy Carter and Karen Carter Peterson both qualified for the April 24 runoff. Carter defeated Carter Peterson in the runoff 55% to 45%.

New Mexico's 1st congressional district 

Incumbent Democrat Deb Haaland was nominated to become the U.S. Secretary of the Interior for the Biden administration and has been confirmed by the Senate. She resigned from her seat on March 16, 2021. Governor Michelle Lujan Grisham called a special election to be held on June 1.

Nominees for the general election were chosen by each state party's central committee. Among a number of candidates, state legislators Melanie Stansbury and Antoinette Sedillo Lopez advanced to the second round of voting, in which Stansbury narrowly prevailed. She would then defeat Republican nominee Mark Moores, as well as Aubrey Dunn Jr., the former state land commissioner who ran as an independent.

Texas's 6th congressional district 

Incumbent Republican Ron Wright died on February 7, 2021. A special nonpartisan election to fill the seat was called by Governor Greg Abbott for May 1, with a runoff on July 27.

No candidate reached the 50% threshold necessary to win the first round on May 1. Susan Wright and Jake Ellzey qualified for the runoff. Elizey defeated Wright 53%-46% in the runoff election on July 28, 2021.

Ohio's 11th congressional district 

Incumbent Democrat Marcia Fudge was nominated to become the U.S. Secretary of Housing and Urban Development for the Biden administration and was confirmed by the Senate. She resigned from her seat on March 10, 2021.

County councilor Shontel Brown won a competitive primary against Our Revolution president Nina Turner. She would then handily win the general election, defeating Laverne Gore by a 58-point margin.

Ohio's 15th congressional district 

Incumbent Republican Steve Stivers resigned on May 16, 2021, to accept the position as president and CEO of the Ohio Chamber of Commerce.

The crowded Republican primary was won by coal mining lobbyist Mike Carey, defeating state legislators Ron Hood, Jeff LaRe, and Bob Peterson, among others. He defeated Democratic nominee Allison Russo by a comfortable margin.

References 

 
2021